Leonard Gilbert Ratner (July 30, 1916 – September 2, 2011), was an American musicologist, Professor of Musicology at Stanford University,  He was a specialist in the style of the Classical period, and best known as a developer of the concept of Topic theory.

Biography
Ratner was born in Minneapolis, Minnesota.

Career
In 1947, he joined the newly formed Department of Music at Stanford University, and continued there  until his retirement in 1984 composing, teaching, and conducting research on music theory.
He composed a chamber opera,  The Necklace, and several chamber works. He taught composition and theory to advanced students and coached chamber music; he also taught elementary music appreciation courses for undergraduates, Stanford alumni, and the general public. He was awarded a Guggenheim Fellowship for1962, and elected as a Fellow of the American Academy of Arts and Sciences in 1998. 

His research was devoted to emphasizing "sonata form's harmonic underpinnings as an antidote to the thematic perspective"  and developing a theory of musical period and form.

Publications

Books
Music: The Listener's Art NY: McGraw-Hill. 1st ed. 1957; 2nd. ed 196; 3rd ed. 1977
Harmony, Structure, and Style NY: McGraw-Hill, 1962
Classic Music: Expression, Form, and Style NY: Schrimer, 1980
Review by Jane Stevens, Journal of Music Theory 27 (1983)
The Musical Experience: Sound, Movement, and Arrival NY:Freeman, 1983
'Romantic Music: Sound, and Syntax NY: Schrimer, 1992
the Beethoven String Quartets: Compositional Strategies and Rhetoric Stanford: Stanford Bookstore, 1995

Academic journal articles
"Harmonic aspects of Classic Form" Journal of the American Musicological Society  2 (3), Autumn, 1949 p.159-68
"Eighteenth-Century Theories of Musical Period Structure" Musical Quarterly 42(4) Oct. 1956 p 439-454
"On the nature and value of theoretical training" ("A Forum: Music theory for the Layman") Journal of Music Theory 3 (1959) 58-69
"Approaches to Musical Historiography of the Eighteenth Century" Current Musicology 9 (1969) 154-57
"Key Definition: A structural problem in Beethoven's Music" Journal of the American Musicological Society, 23(3) Autumn, 1970 472-83
"Texture: A Rhetorical element in Beethoven;s Quartets" Israel Studies in Musicology 2 (1980)  p. 51-62
"Topical content in Mozart's Keyboard Sonatas"  Early Music' 19 (4) (1991) 615-19
"'Mozart's Parting Gifts" Journal of Musicology 18(1) Winter, 2001, 189-211

Other
"Development" and "Sonata Form" in Harvard Dictionary of Music, 2nd ed., 1969. 
"Koch, Heinrich Cristoph" "Period"  and "Riepel, Joseph" in New Grove Dictionary of Music and Musicians'' 1980

References

1916 births
2011 deaths
People from Minneapolis
University of California, Berkeley alumni
Stanford University faculty
American musicologists